Patrick Chapin is an American Magic: The Gathering Pro Tour player and a game designer for Eternal (video game) at Dire Wolf Digital.

Achievements
Chapin has made six Pro Tour top eights, spanning three decades, and four Grand Prix top eights. In 2012, Chapin was voted into the Magic: The Gathering Hall of Fame. His induction took place during Pro Tour Return to Ravnica in October 2012. A mirror match against Gabriel Nassif at Worlds 2007 featuring Chapin's Dragonstorm deck "remains one of the most entertaining matches of Magic ever seen on camera".

Chapin is the author of two books, Next Level Magic, published in 2010, and Next Level Deckbuilding. He has published over 85 articles on Star City Games and produces Top Level Podcast with Michael Flores. In 2011, he published a rap album with Bill Boulden, Tha Gatherin.

References

American Magic: The Gathering players
Living people
Year of birth missing (living people)
People from Denver
People from Detroit